Henry Winston Noble (5 July 1909 – 28 March 1964) was a member of the Queensland Legislative Assembly.

Biography
Noble was born at Brisbane, Queensland, the son of the Alexander Noble and his wife Alice Ann (née Wood). He was educated at Brisbane Grammar School and went on to the University of Queensland and the University of Sydney where he earned his MBBS. He became a resident medical officer in Sydney before heading back to Brisbane and working as a medical practitioner in Brisbane. In 1942 he joined the Australian Army and served in the 7th Field Ambulance, being discharged a year later with the rank of captain.

On 27 June 1936, Noble married Myra Edith Godwin and together had three sons and two daughters. He died of a heart attack at his holiday house at Mooloolaba in March 1964. He was accorded a state funeral and cremated at the Mt Thompson Crematorium.

Public life
After losing to future Queensland Premier, Vince Gair for the seat of South Brisbane at the 1947 Queensland state election, Noble, for the Liberal Party, won the new seat of Yeronga at the 1950 Queensland state election and held the seat until his death in 1964. From 1957 until his death he was the Minister for Health and Home Affairs.

References

1909 births
1964 deaths
Members of the Queensland Legislative Assembly
Liberal Party of Australia members of the Parliament of Queensland
University of Queensland alumni
University of Sydney alumni
20th-century Australian politicians
20th-century Australian medical doctors